Henry Ludwig Mond, 2nd Baron Melchett (10 May 1898 – 22 January 1949) was a British politician, industrialist and financier.

Early life and education
Henry Mond was born in London, the only son of Alfred Mond, 1st Baron Melchett and his wife Violet (née Goetze). He was educated at Winchester College. In the First World War he was commissioned with the South Wales Borderers on 9 April 1915 and wounded in 1916.

Business life
He then joined some of his father's businesses, becoming a director of Imperial Chemical Industries and serving as deputy chairman from 1940 to 1947. He was also a director of the Mond Nickel Company and Barclays Bank.

Politics
He served as Member of Parliament for the Isle of Ely 1923-24 as a Liberal. He won against Unionist candidate Max Townley in the 1923 general election with a small majority of 467. In the same election his father, Sir Alfred Mond, Bt, lost his seat of Swansea West. He was unable to retain the Isle of Ely at the 1924 general election.

Like his father, he later became a Conservative. He was Conservative Member of Parliament for Liverpool East Toxteth from 1929 to 1930, when, on the death of his father, he succeeded to the barony becoming the 2nd Baron Melchett. He then set about restoring the family finances and moved his interests away from politics to economics.

Religion

Having been brought up in the Church of England, he reverted in the 1930s to his family's original Judaism and became a champion of Zionism, hoping that the Jews and Arabs could live harmoniously alongside each other. He advocated the evacuation of Jews from Germany to Palestine and supported the formation of an independent state of Palestine as part of the British Commonwealth. He was chairman of the Jewish Agency for Palestine and took an interest in the Maccabi Jewish youth organisation.

Personal life

He married Amy Gwen Wilson (usually called Gwen, the daughter of Edward John Wilson, who lived in Johannesburg), at Chelsea Register Office on 30 January 1920. She was described as "a show stopping beauty and artist". Their relationship began when she was living with writer Gilbert Cannan, a friend of D. H. Lawrence, and they initially formed a ménage à trois.

From 1930 the couple lived in a London home, Mulberry House in Smith Square, Westminster. This showed a naked couple in an intimate embrace watched by society ladies in a state of outrage. The sculpture and the Baron's relationship led to censure and outrage from their contemporaries. In 2008 "Scandal" was bought for £106,000 by the Victoria and Albert Museum where it is on display.

Family

They had had two sons – the Honourable Derek John Henry Mond (18 October 1922 – 30 April 1945), Julian (9 January 1925 – 15 June 1973), and one daughter, the Honourable Karis Valerie Violet (26 July 1927 – 8 February 2006). Derek was killed in a flying accident while he was serving with the Royal Naval Volunteer Reserve in 1945. 

Mond bought and restored Colworth House on the edge of the Bedfordshire village of Sharnbrook and lived there for twelve years. During World War II he made the house available for the recuperation of American nurses and to house Jewish refugees. He sold the house to Unilever in 1947 due to his wife's belief that moving to Florida would restore his health. He died at Miami Beach, Florida in 1949 aged 50 and the title passed to his surviving son Julian. Mond was cremated in Islington.

Publications
Why the Crisis? (1931)
Modern Money (1932)
Thy Neighbour (1937)
Hunting and Polo

Coat of arms

See also
Ludwig Mond Award
Melchett Medal
Mond gas
Brunner Mond

Notes

External links 
 
 

1898 births
1949 deaths
Barons in the Peerage of the United Kingdom
Liberal Party (UK) MPs for English constituencies
Conservative Party (UK) MPs for English constituencies
UK MPs 1923–1924
UK MPs 1929–1931
Melchett, B2
English Jews
British Ashkenazi Jews
British Zionists
English people of German-Jewish descent
Converts to Judaism from Anglicanism
People educated at Winchester College
South Wales Borderers officers
British Army personnel of World War I
British landowners
Henry Mond, 2nd Baron Melchett
Jewish British politicians
People from Sharnbrook
Military personnel from London
20th-century English businesspeople